Hyalinobatrachium valerioi, sometimes known as the La Palma glass frog, is a species of frog in the family Centrolenidae. It is found in central Costa Rica and south to Panama and the Pacific lowlands and slopes of western Colombia and Ecuador; also in the Magdalena River Valley of Colombia (Colombian distribution is poorly resolved).

Description
The dorsum is spotted yellow, with green reticulations between the spots. There might be some small dark spots in the green areas. The ventral surface is transparent, however the heart is covered by white tissue and is not visible. Also the liver and digestive tract are white. Their eye color is gold.

Hyalinobatrachium valerioi glass frogs are carnivores, their diet mainly including small insects like crickets, moths, flies, spiders, and other smaller frogs.

The egg clutches, containing no more than 40 eggs, are laid on the underside of leaves over streams. Contrary to most other glass frogs, the male remains with its egg clutches also during daylight hours, performing 24-hour egg attendance.

Habitat and conservation
Its natural habitats are moist primary and secondary lowland forests. Adult frogs are typically found in bushes and trees along forest streams. The species tolerates some habitat modification, provided that vegetation over streams remains.

Hyalinobatrachium valerioi is declining in parts of its range while it is considered stable in others. Habitat loss (deforestation) is a significant threat, as is pollution from the spraying of illegal crops.

References

valerioi
Amphibians of Colombia
Amphibians of Costa Rica
Amphibians of Ecuador
Amphibians of Panama
Taxa named by Emmett Reid Dunn
Amphibians described in 1931
Taxonomy articles created by Polbot